Jana Horn is an American folk musician based in Austin, Texas.

History
Jana Horn grew up in Glen Rose, Texas. She is a teacher and a fiction writer in the MFA program at the University of Virginia. When she was growing up, she became interested in Christian screamo music. Prior to the release of her debut album, Horn had recorded an album that was not released. Her debut album, Optimism, was initially self-released before the Philadelphia record label No Quarter decided to give the album a wider release.

Discography
Studio albums
Optimism (2020, No Quarter)

External sites

References

Folk musicians from Texas
21st-century American women musicians
People from Glen Rose, Texas
Year of birth missing (living people)
Living people